Gaztelugatxe is an islet on the coast of Biscay belonging to the municipality of Bermeo, Basque Country (Spain). It is connected to the mainland by a man-made bridge. On top of the island stands a hermitage (named Gaztelugatxeko Doniene in Basque; San Juan de Gaztelugatxe in Spanish), dedicated to John the Baptist, that dates from the 10th century, although discoveries indicate that the date might be the 9th century. With another small neighboring island, Aketx, they form a protected biotope that extends from the town of Bakio to Cape Matxitxako, on the Bay of Biscay.

Etymology 
The word gaztelugatxe  comes from the Basque gaztelu =  "castle" and atx = "rock", forming "the rock castle". The word atx and its derivatives are usual in Basque toponyms related to rocky summits: Aketx, Untzillatx, Atxulo...

Description 

The Basque coast is rough in this area. The sea ceaselessly erodes the rocky coast creating tunnels, arches, and caves. The island of Gaztelugatxe is in the center of this section of the coast next to the small Aketx island, a sanctuary for marine birds.

Next to the hermitage, there is a small shelter with sea views that are used for picnicking and for refuge from the wind.

The hermitage is accessed by a narrow path, crossing the solid stone bridge, and going up 231 steps (other sources cite the number as 229 or 237). According to legend, after the slightly strenuous climb to the top of the crag one should ring the bell three times and make a wish.

Hermitage 

The small church, 80 metres above sea level, dates from the 10th century. In the year 1053 it was donated by Don Íñigo López, Lord of Biscay to the monastery of San Juan de la Peña near Jaca in Huesca. Medieval burials from the 9th and 12th centuries have been found on the esplanade and in the hermitage.

In 1593 it was attacked and sacked by Francis Drake. Among other incidents, it has caught fire several times. On November 10, 1978, it was destroyed in one such fire. Two years later, on June 24, 1980, it was re-inaugurated. The hermitage belongs to the parish of San Pelayo in Bakio.

The hermitage also houses votive offerings from sailors who survived shipwrecks.

Strategic uses 
The strategic location of the site has given it an important role in historic episodes. It was one of the places where the Lord of Biscay, Juan Núñez de Lara, confronted Alfonso XI, King of Castile, in 1334.

In 1594 it was attacked by the Huguenots of La Rochelle, who sacked it and killed the caretaker. In the 18th century it was assaulted by English troops; in the Spanish Civil War the naval Battle of Cape Machichaco took place nearby.

Filming location

HBO filmed scenes for season seven of its fantasy series Game of Thrones at the islet. Gaztelugatxe stood in for Dragonstone, with a digitally created castle on top of the islet.

Gallery

References

External links 

 Gaztelugatxe, Bermeo Town Council website.
San Juan de Gaztelugatxe

Green Spain
Geography of Biscay
Islands of Spain
Landforms of the Basque Country (autonomous community)
Islands of the Bay of Biscay